The Fort Fraser station is a railway station in Fort Fraser, British Columbia. It is on the Canadian National Railway mainline and serves Via Rail's Jasper–Prince Rupert train as a flag stop.

References 

Via Rail stations in British Columbia